WBBE (97.9 FM, "97.9 Bob FM") is an adult hits hybrid radio station licensed to Heyworth, Illinois, and residing in the Bloomington-Normal, Illinois, market. It is owned and operated by Elizabeth Neuhoff's Neuhoff Corp., through licensee Neuhoff Media Bloomington, LLC.

External links
Bob FM 97.9 WBBE official website

BBE
Adult hits radio stations in the United States
Bob FM stations
Radio stations established in 1972
McLean County, Illinois